Saidpur Cantonment is the Bangladeshi military cantonment in Saidpur, Nilphamari District, Bangladesh. It functions under the area command of Rangpur Area.

Formations
 222nd Infantry Brigade (under 66th Infantry Division, Rangpur)
 EME Centre and School (EMEC&S)

Education
 Bangladesh Army University of Science and Technology
 Saidpur Cantonment Public School & College
 Saidpur Cantonment Board High School

References

Cantonments of Bangladesh